Ceduna may refer to:

Ceduna, South Australia, a town and locality
Ceduna Airport
District Council of Ceduna, a local government area

See also
Ceduna Waters, South Australia